Piazza Carlo Felice is a city square in Turin, Italy.

Buildings around the square
Torino Porta Nuova railway station

Piazzas in Turin